Darren Collins may refer to:

 Darren Collins (English footballer) (born 1967), English former footballer
 Darren Collins (Australian footballer) (born 1967), former Australian rules footballer
 Darren Collins (athlete), Australia Paralympic athlete

See also
 Darron Collins (born 1970), American human ecologist